Daiei Film Co. Ltd. (Kyūjitai:  Shinjitai:  Daiei Eiga Kabushiki Kaisha) was a Japanese film studio. Founded in 1942 as Dai Nippon Film Co., Ltd., it was one of the major studios during the postwar Golden Age of Japanese cinema, producing not only artistic masterpieces, such as Akira Kurosawa's Rashomon (1950) and Kenji Mizoguchi's Ugetsu (1953), but also launching several film series, such as Gamera,  Zatoichi and Yokai Monsters, and making the three Daimajin films (1966). It declared bankruptcy in 1971 and was acquired by Kadokawa Pictures.

History

Origin
Daiei Film was the product of government efforts to reorganize the film industry during World War II in order to rationalize use of resources and increase control over the medium. Against a government plan to combine all the film studios into two companies, Masaichi Nagata, an executive at Shinkō Kinema, pressed hard for an alternative plan to create three studios. His efforts won out and Shinkō Kinema, Daito Eiga, and the production arm of Nikkatsu (the Nikkatsu theaters did not take part in the merger) were merged in 1942 to form the Dai Nippon Eiga Seisaku Kabushiki Kaisha, or Daiei for short. The novelist Kan Kikuchi served as the first president, with Nagata continuing as an executive. Daiei's studios were located in Chofu, Tokyo and in Uzumasa in Kyoto.

Golden era

Nagata became president in 1947 and, apart from a brief period when he was purged by Occupation authorities, remained in that position until 1971. Under his reign, Daiei produced Akira Kurosawa's Rashomon (1950) and entered it in the Venice Film Festival, where it won the grand prize and became the first Japanese film to win an international award, thus introducing Japanese cinema to the world. Daiei also produced Teinosuke Kinugasa's Gate of Hell (1953), the first Japanese color film to be shown abroad, earning both an honorary Academy Award for Best Foreign Language Film and the Palme d'Or at the Cannes Film Festival. Daiei also produced such renowned films as Kenji Mizoguchi's Ugetsu (1953) and Sansho the Bailiff (1954), as well as Jokyo ("A Woman's Testament", 1960) which was entered into the 10th Berlin International Film Festival. On the popular front, Daiei was also known for such successful film series as the Zatoichi series starring Shintaro Katsu, the Nemuri Kyoshiro (Sleepy Eyes of Death) series starring Raizō Ichikawa, the original Gamera series, the Daimajin trilogy and the Yokai Monsters trilogy. Daiei also produced many television series such as Shōnen Jet.

At its peak, Daiei featured such talent as the actors Raizō Ichikawa, Shintaro Katsu, Kazuo Hasegawa, Fujiko Yamamoto, Machiko Kyō, and Ayako Wakao; the directors Kenji Mizoguchi, Kon Ichikawa, Yasuzo Masumura, Tokuzō Tanaka, and Kenji Misumi; and the cinematographer Kazuo Miyagawa and Fujirō Morita.

Like some other Japanese film studios, Daiei had its own professional baseball team in the 1950s, the Daiei Stars, which later became the Daiei Unions. These teams eventually became the Chiba Lotte Marines.

Bankruptcy and afterward
Suffering from Nagata's profligacy and an industry-wide decline in attendance, Daiei tried to stay alive by teaming up with Nikkatsu to create Dainichi Eihai, but eventually declared bankruptcy in December 1971. Art director Yoshinobu Nishioka and some of the studio's other employees founded Eizo Kyoto Production. Other members of the union, however, succeeded in getting Yasuyoshi Tokuma, the president of the publishing house Tokuma Shoten, to revive the company in 1974. The company continued as a producer, making only a small number of films, some of which were big budget spectaculars like the international co-production The Go Masters (1982), a new Gamera trilogy (1995, 1996 and 1999), art house hits like Shall We Dance? (1996), and genre films like Kiyoshi Kurosawa's Pulse or Takashi Miike's Dead or Alive films.

Following the passing of Yasuyoshi Tokuma, Daiei Film Co. was sold to the Kadokawa Shoten Publishing Co. In November 2002, Chairman Maihiko Kadokawa announced that Daiei Film Co. would merge with the company’s own film division, Kadokawa Pictures, to form Kadokawa-Daiei Film Co. Ltd. In 2004, it dropped the name Daiei and is now known simply as Kadokowa Pictures.

Filmography
List of Daiei films

Anime productions
 Gaki Dekas OVA (1989)
 La Blue Girl (1989-1992)
 The Dark Myth (1990)
 Dark Warrior (1991)
 Makyu Senjo 2 (1991)
 La Blue Girl EX (1994)
 Hokago no Shokuinshitsu (1994)
 Pom Poko (1994)
 Twin Dolls (1994)
 Venus 5 (1994)
 Lesson XX (1995)
 Twin Angels (1995)
 The Adventures of Kotetsu (1996-1997)
 Pure Love (1998-1999)
 Terra Story (1998)
 Someday's Dreamers (2003)

See also
Toho
Shintoho
Tsuburaya Productions
Kadokawa Daiei Studio
Nikkatsu
Shochiku
Toei Company

References

External links 
 
The Official Tsuburaya Productions Webpage (English)

1942 establishments in Japan
1971 disestablishments in Japan
Mass media companies established in 1942
Mass media companies disestablished in 1971
Japanese film studios
Former Kadokawa Corporation subsidiaries